The 1973–74 season was Fussball Club Basel 1893's 80th season in their existence. It was their 28th consecutive season in the top flight of Swiss football after their promotion the season 1945–46. They played their home games in the St. Jakob Stadium.

Overview

Pre-season
Helmut Benthaus was first team manager. This was his ninth season as manager. To the beginning of the season Urs Siegenthaler moved on to play for Xamax and Rolf Riner left to play for Servette. In the other direction Rudolf Wampfler joined from Sion, Arthur von Wartburg joined from Concordia Basel and Roland Paolucci returned from his loan to Winterthur. 

But the most notorious transfer was that of Teófilo Cubillas from Alianza Lima. The Basler entrepreneur and transport company owner Ruedi Reisdorfer paid the transfer fee of £97,000. Cubillas scored two goals for Basel in the 1973–74 European Cup, the first of which in the 1st leg against Fram on 19 September 1973 and the second in the return leg on 20 September. He only remained at the club for six months, which was not long enough for him to show the extent of his talent. Later on, for the second half of the 1973–74 season he joined Portuguese club Porto for a fee of £200,000.

Basel played a total of 54 games in their 1973–74 season. 26 in the domestic league, four in the Swiss Cup, one in the Swiss League Cup, six in the European Cup and 17 were friendly matches. The team scored a total of 143 goals and conceded 91.

Domestic league
The Nationalliga A season 1973–74 was contested under 14 teams. These were the top 12 teams from the previous 1972–73 season and the two newly promoted teams Xamax and Chênois. The championship was played in a double round robin. The champions would qualify for the 1974–75 European Cup, the second and third placed teams were to qualify for 1974–75 UEFA Cup and the last two teams in the table at the end of the season were to be relegated. Zürich won the championship 12 points ahead of Grasshopper Club, 13 ahead of the Servette and FC Winterthur. Basel finished in fifth position and were 16 points behind the new champions. Basel won 13 of their 26 league games, drew three and lost ten games. They scored a total of 57 goals conceding 39. La Chaux-de-Fonds and Chiasso suffered relegation. Basel's striker Ottmar Hitzfeld was the team's top goal scorer, with 19 league goals he was third in the league ranking behind Daniel Jeandupeux (22) and Walter Müller (21). Basel's second top scorer was Walter Mundschin with seven goals, René Hasler and Karl Odermatt each scored six goals, Walter Balmer managed five and Teófilo Cubillas scored three league goals.

Basel's highest scoring game was in the 24th round on 8 May 1974 as they sent Lausanne-Sports home with an 8–2 package from the St. Jakob Stadium. Karl Odermatt scored the first two goals in the 5th and the 11th minute, Ottmar Hitzfeld added the next two in the 15th and 17th minute before Walter Mundschin added the next two in the 20th and 25th Minute to make it six goals in 25 minutes. A penalty goal by Müller pulled one back for Lausanne-Sport, but despite this Basel led 6–1 at half time. Hitzfeld scored his personal third goal in the 57th minute and in the 75th Markus Tanner netted the final goal of the game. Roger Piccand had scored Lausannes second in the 71st minute.

Swiss Cup and League Cup
In the Swiss Cup Basel played the round of 32 on 22 September 1973 away against Biel-Bienne in the Gurzelen Stadion and won 2–1. In the round of 16 on 6 October 1973 they played away again against Mendrisiostar and won 4–1. In this game Cubillas scored two goals. The quarter-final was a two legged fixtures. The first leg played on 31 October 1973 in Stade Tourbillon was a 1–0 defeat against Sion. The second leg played on 4 November 1973 in the St. Jakob Stadium ended in a 2–2 draw, thus Sion won 3–2 on aggregate. In the 1973 Swiss League Cup Basel were drawn with an away game against Neuchâtel Xamax in the first round and were eliminated.

European Cup
As reigning Swiss Champions, Basel were qualified for the 1973–74 European Cup. In the first round, drawn against Iceland's champions Fram, Basel won with the aggregate score 11–2. In the second round they were drawn against Club Brugge. In the exiting second leg Basel won 6–4 and thus 7–6 on aggregate. In the quarter-final Basel won the first leg against Celtic 3–2 and in the second leg Celtic won by the same score. During extra time Scottish international Steve Murray scored the decisive goal in the 114th minute. Celtic continued to the semi-final but did not reach the final.

Players 

 
 

 
 
 
 

  
 

 
  
 
 

 
 

 

 

 

Players who left the squad

Results 
Legend

Friendly matches

Pre-season and mid-season

Winter break to end of season

Nationalliga

League matches

League standings

Swiss Cup

Swiss League Cup

European Cup

Coppa delle Alpi

Group B matches

NB: teams did not play compatriots

Group B standings

See also
 History of FC Basel
 List of FC Basel players
 List of FC Basel seasons

References

Sources 
 Rotblau: Jahrbuch Saison 2015/2016. Publisher: FC Basel Marketing AG. 
 Die ersten 125 Jahre. Publisher: Josef Zindel im Friedrich Reinhardt Verlag, Basel. 
 Verein "Basler Fussballarchiv" Homepage
 Switzerland 1973–74 at RSSSF
 Swiss League Cup at RSSSF
 Cup of the Alps 1973 at RSSSF

External links
 FC Basel official site

FC Basel seasons
Basel